was the 12th rensho (1315–1326) and 15th shikken (19 April 1326 – 29 April 1326) of the Kamakura shogunate.

References

Hōjō clan
1278 births
1333 deaths
Regents of Japan
People of Kamakura-period Japan